The Maison de Balzac is a writer's house museum in the former residence of French novelist Honoré de Balzac (1799–1850). It is located in the 16th arrondissement at 47, rue Raynouard, Paris, France, and open daily except Mondays and holidays; admission to the house is free, but a fee is charged for its temporary exhibitions. The nearest métro and RER stations are Passy and Avenue du Président Kennedy.

The modest house, with its courtyard and garden, is located within the residential district of Passy near the Bois de Boulogne. Having fled his creditors, Balzac rented its top floor from 1840 to 1847 under his housekeeper's name (Mr. de Breugnol). It was acquired by the city of Paris in 1949, and is now one of the city's three literary museums, along with the Maison de Victor Hugo and the Musée de la Vie Romantique (George Sand). It is the only one of Balzac's many residences still in existence.

Balzac's five-room apartment was located on the top floor, at three levels, and as today opened into the garden. Here he edited La Comedie humaine and wrote some of his finest novels, including La Rabouilleuse, Une ténébreuse affaire, and La Cousine Bette. Although the writer's furniture was dispersed after his widow's death, the museum now contains Balzac's writing desk and chair, his turquoise-studded cane by Lecointe (1834), and his tea kettle and a coffee pot given to him by Zulma Carraud in 1832.

The museum also contains an 1842 daguerreotype of Balzac by Louis-Auguste Bisson, a drawing of Balzac by Paul Gavarni (c. 1840), a pastel portrait (c. 1798) of Balzac's mother Laure Sallambier (1778–1854), an oil portrait (c. 1795–1814) of his father Bernard-François Balzac (1746–1829), and 19th-century prints by renowned artists including Paul Gavarni, Honoré Daumier, Grandville, and Henry Bonaventure Monnier.

Since 1971 the house's ground floor has contained a library of the author's manuscripts, original and subsequent editions, illustrations, books annotated and signed by Balzac, books devoted to Balzac, and other books and magazines of the period.

In 2012, Balzac's House was renovated in order to meet current standards and now has a more modern appearance.

The house is also notable for underlying cavities which have been identified by pottery shards as former troglodyte dwellings dated to the time of the late Middle Ages. These excavations, however, are not open to the public.

Balzac's House is one of the 14 City of Paris' Museums that have been incorporated since January 1, 2013 in the public institution Paris Musées.

Theater at the Maison de Balzac 
 1993: The Muse of the Department
 1994 and 1999: Letters of Two Brides
 1998: Eugenie Grandet or history of a still life
 2012: Seraphita, adapted and directed by Ouriel Zohar, with Barbara Heman

See also 
 List of museums in Paris
 List of works by Alexandre Falguière

References

External links 
 Museum on Paris Musées' website
 Museum's web pages on paris.fr
 Paris Musées official website
 Frommers description

Museums in Paris
Historic house museums in Paris
Honoré de Balzac
Buildings and structures in the 16th arrondissement of Paris
Houses in Paris
Literary museums in France
Paris Musées
Maisons des Illustres